Choi Won-jong is a South Korean archer. At the 2005 Korean National Sports Festival in Ulsan, Choi set a world record by shooting a perfect score of 120 (twelve consecutive shots in the bullseye) in the semifinals of the club-division archery individual competition.

See also
Korean archery
Archery
List of South Korean archers

References

South Korean male archers
Year of birth missing (living people)
Living people